Brenda Elder (born 1938) is an English actress, best remembered for her recurring role as Elsie Seddon, the mother of Sally Webster, in Coronation Street from 1986 to 1997.

Television Roles
Coronation Street (10 roles):
Waitress (1964; 1 episode)
Customer (1967; 1 episode)
Mrs Bolan (1968; 1 episode)Bride (1968; 1 episode)
Flo (1972; 1 episode)
Mrs. Hillkirk (1973; 1 episode)
Eunice Wheeler (1975; 2 episodes)
Woman in Corridor (1978; 1 episode)
Mrs. Mossop (1983; 1 episode)
Elsie Seddon (1986, 1989, 1990–91, 1997; 12 episodes)
A Touch of Grace:
Guest Star (1973; 1 episode)
Brookside:
Barbara Black (1986)
How We Used To Live:
Sarah Selby (1984–85; 8 episodes)
Heartbeat:
Agnes (1998; 1 episode)

References

External links

20th-century English actresses
English soap opera actresses
Living people
Place of birth missing (living people)
1938 births